Clube Atlético Taboão da Serra, or simply Taboão da Serra, is a Brazilian football team based in Taboão da Serra, São Paulo, founded in 1985.

History
The club was founded on December 12, 1985. Taboão da Serra won the Campeonato Paulista Série B2 in 2004, and the Campeonato Paulista Segunda Divisão in 2010.

Achievements

 Campeonato Paulista Segunda Divisão:
 Winners (1): 2010
 Campeonato Paulista Série B2:
 Winners (1): 2004

Notable players 
  Gabriel Paulista
  Adriano Gabiru
  Edílson Capetinha
  Túlio Maravilha
  Tuta
  Viola

Stadium
Clube Atlético Taboão da Serra play their home games at Estádio Municipal Vereador José Ferez. The stadium has a maximum capacity of 10,000 people.

References

Association football clubs established in 1985
Football clubs in São Paulo (state)
1985 establishments in Brazil